The Journal of Computing Sciences in Colleges is a bimonthly peer-reviewed, open access academic journal published by the Consortium for Computing Sciences in Colleges (CCSC) covering topics associated with computer science, education, and current technologies and methods in these areas. The journal also publishes the proceedings from the conferences held annually in each of the CCSC regions.

The journal was established in 1985 as the Journal of Computing in Small Colleges.

Abstracting and indexing
This journal is indexed by:
 ACM Computing Reviews
 ACM Digital Library
 ACM Guide to Computing Literature

See also

 Association for Computing Machinery
 ACM Technical Symposium on Computer Science Education
 Computer Science Teachers Association

References

External links

Computer science journals
English-language journals
Open access journals
Publications established in 1985